Glycin, or N-(4-hydroxyphenyl)glycine, is N-substituted p-aminophenol. It is a photographic developing agent used in classic black-and-white developer solutions. It is unrelated to the amino acid glycine.  It is typically characterized as thin plates of white or silvery powder, although aged samples appear brown. It is sparingly soluble in water and most organic solvents; it is readily soluble in alkalies and acids.

Glycin is structurally related to 4-aminophenol and Metol. Decarboxylation of glycin gives Metol. Glycin has a milder reduction potential than Metol.  The two developers have markedly different character. Glycin is slower-acting, but much longer-lasting in solution. Glycin is rarely used as a developing agent, primarily because it is expensive. In its dry form, it also has limited shelf life compared to Metol and Phenidone. 

Glycin can be synthesized by treating p-aminophenol with chloracetic acid in a solvent.

Glycin is employed in some procedures of analytical chemistry.

References

Phenols
Amino acids
Photographic chemicals